The Pittsburgh Pirates were an American professional basketball team based in Pittsburgh, Pennsylvania. The team was one of the thirteen founding members of the National Basketball League (NBL), which formed in 1937.

Franchise history
The team was founded in 1937 as one of the founding teams of the National Basketball League. The team never played in the playoffs in their three seasons on the league. From inception and through its first 2 seasons the team was named the "Pirates" until the franchise was inactivated from the summer of 1939 until the summer of 1944, reappearing as the Pittsburgh Raiders for a final season in 1944-45.

Year-by-year

References

 
Basketball teams established in 1937
1937 establishments in Pennsylvania
1945 disestablishments in Pennsylvania
1944 establishments in Pennsylvania
Basketball teams established in 1944
Sports clubs disestablished in 1945
1939 disestablishments in Pennsylvania
Sports clubs disestablished in 1939